Francis Ford Patterson Jr. (July 30, 1867 – November 30, 1935) was an American Republican Party politician who represented New Jersey's 1st congressional district in the United States House of Representatives from 1920 to 1927.

Life and career

Patterson was born in Newark, the son of Abigail Derrickson (Null) and Francis Ford Patterson. He moved with his parents to Woodbury, in 1874, where he attended the public schools. Patterson was employed in a newspaper office at the age of 13, and moved to Camden, in 1882.

Patterson was connected  with the Camden Courier from 1883–1890, was editor of The Philadelphia Record 1890–1894, and was owner and publisher of the Camden Post-Telegram from 1894–1923. He served as president of the West Jersey Trust Co. 1916–1925, and as director of the West Jersey Title Co. 1920–1925. He served as member of the New Jersey General Assembly in 1900, and was County clerk of Camden County from 1900–1920. He served as delegate to the 1920 Republican National Convention.

Patterson was elected as a Republican to the Sixty-sixth Congress to fill the vacancy caused by the death of William J. Browning. He was reelected to the Sixty-seventh, Sixty-eighth, and Sixty-ninth Congresses and served from November 2, 1920, to March 3, 1927, but was an unsuccessful candidate for renomination in 1926.

After leaving Congress, he engaged in banking, serving as president of the West Jersey Parkside Trust Co., of Camden, until his death at his home in Merchantville, on November 30, 1935. He was interred in Colestown Cemetery, in what is now Cherry Hill Township, New Jersey.

His great-grandson is actor Scott Patterson.

References

External links

Francis Ford Patterson Jr. at The Political Graveyard

1867 births
1935 deaths
Republican Party members of the New Jersey General Assembly
People from Merchantville, New Jersey
Politicians from Camden, New Jersey
Politicians from Newark, New Jersey
Politicians from Woodbury, New Jersey
American publishers (people)
American bankers
Republican Party members of the United States House of Representatives from New Jersey
Burials at Colestown Cemetery (Cherry Hill, New Jersey)